Don't Cry Out Loud is a live album by Elkie Brooks, recorded live at the Shepherd's Bush Empire, London, during her 2004 UK tour. It was released on  CD in 2005 by Recall Records. The title song "Don't Cry Out Loud" was a hit single for Brooks in 1978.

Track listing
Disc one
"I Think I'm Going Back"
"Superstar"
"Rose"
"Sunshine After the Rain"
"Fool If You Think It's Over"
"Runaway"
"No More the Fool"
"Don't Cry Out Loud"
"Lilac Wine"
"Gasoline Alley"
"Nights in White Satin"

Disc 2
"Red House"
"Back Away"
"Muddy Water Blues"
"Pearl's a Singer
"Shooting Star"
"Roadhouse Blues"
"Groom's Still Waiting at the Altar"
"Baby What Do You Want Me to Do"
"Out Of the Rain"
"We've Got Tonight"

Personnel
Elkie Brooks – vocals
Jean Roussel – keyboards
Geoff Whitehorn – guitar
Mike Cahen – guitar
Mike Richardson – drums
Brian Badhams – bass guitar
Lee Noble – backing vocals, percussion

Elkie Brooks albums
Recall Records albums
2005 live albums